William Roger North (1850 – 27 January 1936) was a politician in colonial Queensland. He was a member of the Queensland Legislative Assembly, representing Lockyer from 1888 to 1893.

North was born in Dublin, Ireland.

References

Members of the Queensland Legislative Assembly
1850 births
1936 deaths
Irish emigrants to Australia
Politicians from Dublin (city)